Thomas L. Woltz (born September 25, 1967) is an American landscape architect. He is the owner of landscape architecture firm Nelson Byrd Woltz Landscape Architects (NBW), founded in 1985, and with offices in New York, Charlottesville, Virginia, and Houston, Texas.

Early life
Woltz was born and raised on a cattle and crop farm in Mount Airy, North Carolina. His father, John Elliott Woltz Sr., was the owner of local knitwear company Quality Mills and his mother Mary Patricia “Pat” Gwyn Woltz was a philanthropist, civic leader, and artist. 
 In the 1970s, the family farm was developed into the Cross Creek Country Club.

Woltz earned a bachelor’s degree in architectural design, architectural history, and studio art, and later master’s degrees in both architecture and landscape architecture from the University of Virginia.

Career
After receiving his undergraduate degree from the University of Virginia in 1990, Woltz moved to Venice, Italy, where he worked at architecture firm Giorgio Bellavitis in addition to leading the University of Virginia's summer program for architecture students. He returned to the University of Virginia in 1994 to resume his studies in architecture and landscape architecture, receiving master's degrees for each subject in 1996 and 1997, respectively. Upon graduation, Woltz started working at what was then Nelson Byrd Landscape Architects, under his former professor Warren T. Byrd, Jr., and partner Susan Nelson. In 2003, Woltz became named partner of Nelson Byrd Woltz Landscape Architects, and in 2013, the firm’s sole proprietor.

Throughout his career, Woltz has completed projects in the United States, New Zealand, Canada, Italy, Australia, and the United Kingdom.

Personal life
Woltz lives in Charlottesville, Virginia and New York.

Projects
NBW’s project at Orongo Station in Young Nick's Head, Poverty Bay, New Zealand, which Woltz led, illustrates the firm’s integration of multiple disciplines, such as “art, architecture, agriculture, ecological, and cultural reclamation”, into a single site. The project included the restoration of an old homestead, new buildings, domestic gardens, reconfigured wetlands, a reforested coastline, and expanded access to a Maori burial ground across a 1,200-hectare property.

Other projects by Woltz include:

 Aga Khan Garden at the University of Alberta Botanic Garden, Edmonton, Alberta, Canada
 Sunnyside Yard, Sunnyside, Queens, New York City, New York 
 The Hudson Yards Plaza, New York City, New York
 Citygarden, St. Louis, Missouri
 Naval Cemetery Landscape at the Brooklyn Naval Hospital, Brooklyn, New York
 Orongo Station Conservation Master Plan, Gisborne, New Zealand
 Olana Strategic Landscape Initiatives and Farm Complex 
Restoration, Greenport, Columbia County, New York
 Memorial Park Master Plan, Houston, Texas > 
 Cornwall Park Master Plan, Auckland, New Zealand
 Bok Tower Gardens, Lake Wales, Florida
 Centennial Park, Nashville, Tennessee
 Buckhead Park HUB404, Atlanta, Georgia
 Historic Jay Gardens at the Jay Estate Rye, New York

Honors and awards
In addition to the industry recognition earned by the firm, Woltz has received the awards listed below:

 Design Innovator of the Year, The Wall Street Journal Magazine (2013)
 Fellow, American Society of Landscape Architects (2011)
 Elvira Broome Dolan Medal, Garden Club of America (2018) 
 Fast Company 100 Most Innovative People in Business (2017) 
 Trust for People's Land for People Award Recipient (2019)

References

American landscape architects
University of Virginia School of Architecture alumni
University of Virginia faculty
Living people
1967 births